Anto Đogić (born 18 April 1952) is a retired Bosnian professional basketball player.

Playing career
During his professional career, Đogić played most notably for Bosna.

National team career
Đogić won the gold medal with the Yugoslav national team at the 1977 EuroBasket in Belgium where he was coached by Aleksandar Nikolić.

Footers 
Notes

References

Living people
1952 births
Basketball players from Sarajevo
Croats of Bosnia and Herzegovina
Yugoslav men's basketball players
FIBA EuroBasket-winning players
KK Bosna Royal players
Bosnia and Herzegovina men's basketball players